The Arch of Galerius or Kamara (Καμάρα) and the Rotunda (Ροτόντα) are neighbouring early 4th-century AD monuments in the city of Thessaloniki, in the region of Central Macedonia in northern Greece. As an outstanding example of early Byzantine art and architecture, in addition to the importance of the Rotunda as one of the earliest Christian monuments in the Eastern Roman Empire, both sites were inscribed on the UNESCO World Heritage List in 1988 as part of the Paleochristian and Byzantine monuments of Thessaloniki.

History

The 4th-century Roman emperor Galerius commissioned these two structures as elements of an imperial precinct linked to his Thessaloniki palace. Archeologists have found substantial remains of the palace to the southwest. These three monumental structures were connected by a road that ran through the arch, which rose above the major east–west road of the city.

At the crux of the major axes of the city, the Arch of Galerius emphasized the power of the emperor and linked the monumental structures with the fabric of 4th-century Thessaloniki. The arch was composed of a masonry core faced with marble sculptural panels celebrating a victory over Narses (Narseh), the seventh emperor in the Sassanid Persian Empire, in 299 AD. About two-thirds of the arch is preserved.

The Rotunda was a massive circular structure with a masonry core that had an oculus like the Pantheon in Rome. It has gone through multiple periods of use and modification as a polytheist temple, a Christian basilica, a Muslim mosque, and again a Christian church (and archaeological site). A minaret is preserved from its use as a mosque, and ancient remains are displayed on its southern side.

Location and description of the Arch

The Arch of Galerius stands on what is now the intersection of Egnatia and Dimitriou Gounari streets. Construction of the arch was spanned the years 298 and 299 AD; it was dedicated in 303 AD to celebrate the victory of the tetrarch Galerius over the Sassanid Persians at the Battle of Satala and the capture of their capital Ctesiphon in 298.

The structure was an octopylon (eight-pillared gateway) forming a triple arch that was built of a rubble masonry core faced first with brick and then with marble panels with sculptural relief. The central arched opening was 9.7 m wide and 12.5 m high, and the secondary openings on other side were 4.8 m wide and 6.5 m high. The central arch spanned the portion of the Via Egnatia (primary Roman road from Dyrrhacium to Byzantium) that passed through the city as a decumanus (east-west major street). A road connecting the Rotunda (125m northeast) with the Palace complex (235m southwest) passed through the arch along its long axis.

Only the northwestern three of the eight pillars and parts of the masonry cores of the arches above survive: i.e., the entire eastern side (four pillars) and the southernmost one of the western pillars are lost. Extensive consolidation with modern brick has been performed on the exposed masonry cores to protect the monument. The two pillars flanking the central arched passageway retain their sculpted marble slabs, which depict the wars of Galerius against the Persians in broadly panegyric terms.

Sculptural program of the Arch

Understanding of the sculptural program of the arch is limited by the loss of the majority of the marble panels, but the remains give an impression of the whole. Four vertically stacked registers of sculpted decoration were carved on each pillar, each separated by elaborate moldings. A label for the Tigris River indicates that there were likely labels on other representations as the builders deemed necessary. Artistic license was taken in the representations, for instance, the Caesar Galerius is shown in personal combat with the Sassanid Shah Narses in one of the panels; although they never met in battle. On the arch a mounted Galerius attacks a similarly mounted Narses with a lance as an eagle bearing a victory wreath in its talons approaches Galerius. The Caesar sits securely on his rearing horse, while the Persian king appears nearly unhorsed. Terrified Persians cower under the hooves of the Caesar's horse in the chaos of battle. The panel expresses the power of the Caesar Galerius.

The relief of the imperial family conjoined in a sacrifice of thanksgiving owes its distant prototype to the Augustan reliefs on the Ara Pacis in Rome. Galerius' wife, Diocletian's daughter Valeria, is shown at his side, helping authenticate his connection to his predecessor. Here as elsewhere all the faces have been carefully chiselled off, whether as damnatio memoriae or in later cultural intolerance of images.

In another panel, the tetrarchs are all arrayed in the toga as a Victoria holds a victory wreath out to the heads of the two Augusti. A third panel celebrates the unity of the tetrarchy, with a depiction of the tetrarchs standing together; the depersonalized manner in which the tetrarchs are portrayed is reminiscent of the schematic statues of the tetrarchs in porphyry at St. Mark's Basilica in Venice. Only Galerius is dressed in armor, and he makes the offering upon the altar.

What remains of the arch asserts the glory of the tetrarchy and the prominence of Galerius within that system. The arch celebrates the Roman Empire as part of Galerius' victory over the Sassanid king. Galerius is also pictured on his horse at the right, while attacking a Sassanid guard.

Rotunda of Galerius

Location and description of the Rotunda

The Rotunda of Galerius, also known as the Rotunda of Saint George, is 125m northeast of the Arch of Galerius at 40°37'59.77"N, 22°57'9.77"E. It is also known (by its consecration and use) as the Greek Orthodox Church of Agios Georgios, and is informally called the Church of the Rotunda (or simply The Rotunda).

The cylindrical structure was built around 306 AD on the orders of the tetrarch Galerius, who was thought to have intended it to be his mausoleum. Its circular, centrally planned structure resembles other structures such as Santa Costanza in Rome and is similarly topped by a dome. The structure was converted into a church in the late fourth century and an apsidal choir extension was added as well as a wide ambulatory around the perimeter.  

The Rotunda has a diameter of 24.5 m. Its walls are more than 6 m thick, which is why it has withstood Thessaloniki's earthquakes. The walls are interrupted by eight rectangular bays, with the west bay forming the entrance. A flat brick dome, 30 m high at the peak, crowns the cylindrical structure. In its original design, the dome of the Rotunda had an oculus, as does the Pantheon in Rome.

Uses of the Rotunda

After Galerius's death in 311, he was buried at Felix Romuliana (Gamzigrad) near Zajecar, Serbia. The Rotunda stood empty for several decades until the Emperor Theodosius I ordered its conversion into a Christian church in the late fourth century. The church was embellished with very high quality mosaics. Only fragments have survived of the original decoration, for example, a band depicting saints with hands raised in prayer, in front of complex architectural fantasies.

The building was used as a church (Church of Asomaton or Archangelon) for over 1,200 years until the city fell to the Ottomans. In 1590 it was converted into a mosque, called the Mosque of Suleyman Hortaji Effendi, and a minaret was added to the structure. It was used as a mosque until 1912, when the Greeks captured the city during the Balkan War. Greek Orthodox officials reconsecrated the structure as a church, and they left the minaret. The structure was damaged during an earthquake in 1978 but was subsequently restored. , the minaret was still being stabilized with scaffolding. The building is now a historical monument under the Ephorate of Byzantine Antiquities of the Greek Ministry of Culture, although the Greek Orthodox Church has access to the monument for various festivities some days of the year (as Church of Saint George).

The Rotunda is the oldest of Thessaloniki's churches. Some Greek publications claim it is the oldest Christian church in the world, although there are competitors for that title. It is the most important surviving example of a church from the early Christian period of the Greek-speaking part of the Roman Empire.

Mosaics of the Rotunda

The Rotunda's cupola and the barrel vaults were originally entirely covered in mosaics, many of which are now lost. The surviving mosaics depict many organic forms such as a garland of fruit and evergreen plants that surrounded the lost image of Christ in the cupola. The evergreen wreath is composed of twenty-five sections of branches with white lilies, laurels, pears, grapes and pomegranates. The presence of this evergreen suggests ideas of rebirth and by extension the Resurrection while the inclusion of various plants associated with all the four seasons could symbolize renewal and eternity. In the light openings there are scrolls of ripe fruit accompanied by white lilies. These fruits could symbolize the abundance of heaven while the lily a visual reminder of Christian purity. In the strongly colored barrel vaults one panel displays a variety of fruits including grapes while another depicts a golden cross surrounded by many stylized flowers and acanthus leaves. Acanthus leaves are an ornament dating back to antiquity and were often heavily employed in Greco-Roman architectural adornment. Traditionally acanthus leaves have been interpreted to symbolize enduring life and immortality, making them suitable to promulgate Christian ideas of enduring life with Christ after death, adopting pagan symbolism into Christian ornament in a syncretic manner.

See also
List of Roman triumphal arches
List of Roman domes

Footnotes

Notes

The arch
Dyggve, E. (Copenhagen, 1945). "Recherches sur le palais imperial de Thessalonique".
Engemann, J. (JAC 22, 1979). "Akklamationsrichtung, Sieger- und Besiegtenrichtung auf dem Galeriusbogen in Saloniki".
Garrucci, P. (W. Wylie, trans.). (NC 10, 1870). "Brass Medallion Representing the Persian Victory of Maximianus Galerius".
Hébrard, E. (BCH 44, 1920). "L'Arc de Galère & l'église Saint-Georges à Salonique".
Kinch, K. F. (Paris, 1890). "L'arc de triomphe de Salonique".
Laubscher, H. P. (Berlin, 1975). "Der Reliefschmuck des Galeriusbogens in Thessaloniki".
Makaronas, C. J. (Salonica, 1970). The Arch of Galerius at Thessaloniki.
Meyer, H. (JdI 95, 1980). "Die Frieszyklen am sogenannten Triumphbogen des Galerius in Thessaloniki".
Pond Rothman, M. S. (AJA 81, 1977). "The Thematic Organization of the Panel Reliefs on the Arch of Galerius".
Pond Rothman, M. S. (Byzantine Studies/Etudes Byzantines 2:1, 1975). "The Panel of the Emperors Enthroned on the Arch of Galerius".
Sutherland, C. H. V. (London, 1967), RIC IV: From Diocletian's Reform (A.D. 294) to the Death of Maximinus (A. D. 313)
Velenis, G. (AA, 1979). "Architektonische Probleme des Galeriusbogens in Thessaloniki".
Velenis, G. (AA, 1983). "Nachträgliche Beobachtungen am Oberbau des Galeriusbogens in Thessaloniki".
Vermeule, C. C. (Cambridge, Massachusetts, 1968). "Roman Imperial Art in Greece and Asia Minor".
von Schönebeck, H. (BZ 37, 1937). "Die zyklische Ordnung der Triumphalreliefs am Galeriusbogen in Saloniki".
von Schönebeck, H. (JbBerlMus 58, 1937). (Preserves image of the now lost head of Galerius, possibly from the large Arch of Galerius. The relief head was in Berlin.)

The palace
Αθανασιου, Φ. et al. (ΑΕΜΘ 8, 1994). "Νεα στοιχεια για το Οκταγωνο του γαλεριανου συγκροτηματος".
Αθανασιου, Φ. et al. (Θεσσαλονικεων πολις 3, 1981). "τα ανακτορα του Γαλεριου στη Θεσσαλονικη, Μεθοδολογια αποκαταστασης".
Αθανασιου, Φ. et al. (Θεσσαλονικεων πολις 4, 2001). "Το λουτρα του ανακτορικου συγκροτηματος του Γαλεριου".
Dyggve, E. (Copenhagen, 1945). "Recherches sur le palais imperial de Thessalonique".
Dyggve, E. (Dissertationes Pannonicae ser. 2, 11, 1941). "Kurzer vorläufiger Bericht über die Ausgrabungen im Palastviertel von Thessaloniki".
Hébrard, E. (BCH 44, 1920). "Les Travaux du Service archéologique d'Armée d'Orient a l'arc de triomphe de Galère & à l'arc de triomphe de Galère et à l'église Saint-Georges de Salonique".
Καραμπερη, Μ. (AAA 23–28, 1990-1995). "Ο πολος του Οκταγωνο στο γαλεριανο συγκροτημα και η σχεση του με το νοτιο μεγαλο περιστυλιο".
Καραμπερη, Μ. (Θεσσαλονικεων πολις 3, 2000). "Η αυτοκρατορικη εδρα Θεσσαλονικη".
Sasel, J. (ed.). Tabula Imperii Romani (Sheet K34).
Vichers, M. (BSA 66, 1971). "A note on the Byzantine Palace at Thessaloniki".
Ward-Perkins, J. B. (New York, 1981). "Roman Imperial Architecture".

General reference
Bianchi-Bandinelli, R. (New York, 1971). "Rome: The Late Empire".
Brilliant, R. (L'Arte 10, 1970). "Temporal Aspects in Late Roman Art".
Brown, P. (New York, 1971). "The World of Late Antiquity".
Cameron, A. (Cambridge, Massachusetts, 1993). "The Later Roman Empire, A. D. 284-430".
Kleiner, D. E. E. (New Haven, 1992). "Roman Sculpture".

Further reading
Weitzmann, Kurt, ed., Age of spirituality: late antique and early Christian art, third to seventh century, no. 107 & 491, 1979, Metropolitan Museum of Art, New York, ; full text available online from The Metropolitan Museum of Art Libraries

External links

 Hellenic Ministry of Culture

Buildings and structures completed in the 4th century
Ancient Roman buildings and structures in Greece
Ancient Roman triumphal arches
World Heritage Sites in Greece
Churches in Greece
Tomb of Galerius
Buildings and structures in Thessaloniki
Byzantine architecture
Former mosques in Greece
Roman Thessalonica
Tourist attractions in Thessaloniki
Galerius
4th-century architecture in Greece
Mosques converted from churches in Ottoman Greece